Cactus is a simple test framework for unit testing server-side Java code (Servlets, EJBs, Tag libs, ...) from the Jakarta Project. The intent of Cactus is to lower the cost of writing tests for server-side code. It uses JUnit and extends it. Cactus implements an in-container strategy, meaning that tests are executed inside the container.

Project status 
The Jakarta Cactus project was retired on August 5, 2011.

The Jakarta Cactus project announced the new 1.8.1 version  on January 18, 2009. Version 1.8.1 still does not support JUnit 4.x, although a workaround of sorts is documented . As of 1.8, Cactus uses Cargo for all server-related manipulation.
As of 08/05/2011, cactus has been retired. http://jakarta.apache.org/cactus/mock_vs_cactus.html

External links 
Official Page of Jakarta Cactus
Official Page of the Codehaus Cargo Project

Apache Software Foundation
Unit testing frameworks
Java development tools